The 1970 California gubernatorial election was held on November 3, 1970. The incumbent governor, Republican Ronald Reagan, won re-election over Democrat and Speaker of the Assembly Jesse "Big Daddy" Unruh. This would be the closest election of Ronald Reagan's entire political career while winning.

Primary results

Democratic Party

American Independent Party

Peace and Freedom Party

General election results

Results by county

References

External links
 California Elections Page
 Reagan's Heritage 

Gubernatorial
1970
California
November 1970 events in the United States
Ronald Reagan